Miller, Kentucky may refer to:

Miller, Fulton County, Kentucky, an unincorporated community
Miller, Perry County, Kentucky, an unincorporated community